Scottie Austin Montgomery (born May 26, 1978) is an American football coach who is the assistant head coach and running backs coach for the Detroit Lions of the National Football League (NFL). He most recently was the running back coach for the Indianapolis Colts.  Prior to that he was the offensive coordinator at the University of Maryland. Prior to his tenure with Maryland, he was the head football coach at East Carolina University. He had previously served as an assistant at Duke University and for the Pittsburgh Steelers of the National Football League (NFL). Montgomery grew up in North Carolina and played wide receiver at Duke and in the NFL.

Early years
Montgomery attended Burns High School in Lawndale, North Carolina and was a standout in football, basketball, and track. In football, he was a two-time team MVP, and as a junior, helped lead his team to the State 3A title. In basketball, he won an All-Conference honors and was named the Team MVP. In track, he won All-Conference honors and was the conference champion on the 200 and the 400-meter dashes.

College playing career
Montgomery attended Duke University from 1996 to 1999, finishing his career with 171 receptions (ranking second in Duke's history) for 2,379 yards (third), four 100-yard receiving games (seventh), and 13 touchdowns (eighth). He earned the team's MVP award in 1998 and 1999, becoming just one of five two-time team MVPs in Duke history.  Montgomery joins Clarkston Hines as the only Duke players to have three straight seasons with more than 50 receptions and 600 yards.

Professional playing career
Montgomery entered the National Football League in 2000 as a rookie free agent with the Carolina Panthers. From there, he played for the Denver Broncos for three years (2000–2002) and the Oakland Raiders (2003). In 2005, he played for the Georgia Force in the Arena Football League.

Coaching career
Montgomery began his coaching career at his alma mater, Duke University, where he served as the wide receivers coach for four seasons (2006–2009).

Montgomery was hired by the Pittsburgh Steelers on February 16, 2010, as the wide receivers coach, replacing Randy Fichtner, who moved to quarterback coach upon the retirement of Ken Anderson. He remained with the Steeler organization for three seasons. Notable players coached include Mike Wallace (Pro Bowl 2011), Hines Ward, Emmanuel Sanders, Antwaan Randle El, Antonio Brown (Pro Bowl 2011), and Jerricho Cotchery.

Montgomery returned to Duke as associate head coach and offensive coordinator/passing game while coaching the wide receivers, in 2013. Duke promoted him to offensive coordinator in 2014. Montgomery coached Jamison Crowder (2015, 4th round/#105, Washington Redskins) during 2013 and 2014 seasons.

East Carolina University named Montgomery its head coach on December 13, 2015, replacing Ruffin McNeill.

Montgomery was terminated before the 2018 season finale after posting a 9–26 record in three seasons.

It was announced that Montgomery would join Mike Locksley's staff as the offensive coordinator for the University of Maryland in 2019. He was later terminated after his second season with the Terrapins.

In February 2021, Montgomery was announced by the Indianapolis Colts as a running backs coach. In February 2023, Montgomery was announced by the Detroit Lions as their running backs coach.

Head coaching record

References

External links
 

1978 births
Living people
American football safeties
American football wide receivers
Carolina Panthers players
Denver Broncos players
Detroit Lions coaches
Duke Blue Devils football coaches
Duke Blue Devils football players
East Carolina Pirates football coaches
Georgia Force players
Indianapolis Colts coaches
Oakland Raiders players
Pittsburgh Steelers coaches
People from Shelby, North Carolina
Coaches of American football from North Carolina
Players of American football from North Carolina
African-American coaches of American football
African-American players of American football
20th-century African-American sportspeople
21st-century African-American sportspeople